Kani may refer to:

Geography 
 Kani (island), an island in the Maldives
 Kani, Burma
 Kani, Ivory Coast
 Kani, Iran (disambiguation)
 Kani, Republic of Dagestan, Russia
 Kani District, Gifu, Japan
 Kani, Gifu, Japan
 Kani River, Japan

Other uses 
 KANI, a radio station in Texas, United States
 Kani (letter), a Georgian letter
 Kani (name)
 Kani tribe, a tribe in Kerala
 Kani (paste) (also known as surimi), a food product made from fish
 4265 Kani, an asteroid
 Amiya Deb (1917–1983), Indian footballer and cricketer, nicknamed "Kani"
 Kani (genus), a genus of crab found in India

See also 
 Kâni
 KANI
 Kani-Kéli